Leon David Black (born July 31, 1951) is an American investor and the co-founder and former-CEO of the private equity firm Apollo Global Management. Black also served as the chairman of The Museum of Modern Art (MoMA) in New York City from July 2018 until July 2021.

Black stepped down as CEO and chairman of Apollo Global Management in 2021.

Early life and education
Black is a son of Eli M. Black (1921–1975), a prominent Jewish businessman who emigrated from Poland and was best known for owning the United Brands Company. His mother, Shirley Lubell (sister of Tulsa oil executive Benedict I. Lubell) was an artist. In 1975, his father died by suicide,  jumping out of the 44th floor of the Pan Am Building in New York City. It was later made public that, at the time, federal regulators were investigating allegations that United Brands was bribing Honduran government officials. Black received an AB in philosophy and history from Dartmouth College in 1973 and a MBA from Harvard University in 1975. He served on the Board of Trustees of Dartmouth College from 2002 to 2011. In 2012, Black gave US$48 million toward a new visual arts center at Dartmouth College.

Career
Black started out as an accountant at Peat Marwick (which later became KPMG) and with the publisher of Boardroom Reports. He also interviewed at Lehman Brothers but was told that he didn't have the brains or personality to succeed on Wall Street. From 1977 to 1990, Black was employed by investment bank Drexel Burnham Lambert, where he served as managing director, head of the Mergers & Acquisitions Group, and co-head of the Corporate Finance Department. Black was regarded as "junk bond king" Michael Milken's right-hand man at Drexel. In 1990, he co-founded, on the heels of the collapse of Drexel Burnham Lambert, the private equity firm Apollo Global Management. Notable founders included: John Hannan, Drexel's former co-director of international finance; Craig Cogut, a lawyer who worked with Drexel's high-yield division in Los Angeles; Arthur Bilger, the former head of the Drexel's corporate finance department; Antony Ressler, who worked as a senior vice president in Drexel's high yield department with responsibility for the new issue/syndicate desk; and Marc Rowan, Josh Harris and Michael Gross, who all worked under Black in the mergers and acquisitions department.

Black stepped down as CEO of Apollo in 2021. He remained chairman for several months but stepped down abruptly in March 2021.

Personal life
Black is married to Debra Ressler, a 1976 Barnard College graduate and Broadway producer and sister of Ares Management co-founder Antony Ressler. They have four children. One of their children, Ben, runs an investment fund. Black's wife is a melanoma survivor. In 2007, the couple donated $25 million to form the new Melanoma Research Alliance. Leon and Debra both serve on the board of the organization.

In 2018, he was elected as the chairman of The Museum of Modern Art (MoMA) in New York City. His term commenced on July 1, 2018. His term as chairman ended on July 1, 2021, and he did not seek re-election.

Epstein relationship
Black has stated that he maintained a "limited relationship" with Jeffrey Epstein. In 1997, he made Epstein one of the original trustees of what is today the Debra and Leon Black Foundation. In his 2020 letter to Apollo investors, Black said that Epstein provided him with "estate planning, tax and philanthropic advice" to his "family partnership and other related family entities". The New York Times reported that Black had paid Epstein at least $50 million for such services from 2012 to 2017. While Black has not confirmed the $50 million sum reported by The Times, he did say that he paid Epstein "millions of dollars annually for his work". In October 2020, Black requested that the Apollo board conduct an independent review of his relationship with Epstein, and it retained the law firm Dechert LLP to do so. Black has said that he "deeply regrets" his relationship with Epstein.

The review conducted by Dechert LLP was released on January 25, 2021. It showed that Black had paid Epstein around $158 million from 2012 through 2017 for financial services. Using Epstein's tax avoidance strategies, Black saved at least $1.3 billion. Black pledged his intention to donate $200 million to women’s initiatives.

Sexual misconduct accusations 
In 2021, Black admitted to having what he called a "consensual affair" with Guzel Ganieva, a former model. She claimed in a series of March 2021 tweets that "I was sexually harassed and abused by him for years [and ultimately] forced to sign a non-disclosure agreement under duress". The matter has resulted in lawsuits and countersuits. Ganieva also claimed that Black also introduced her to convicted sex offender Jeffrey Epstein and tried to force her to have sex with them. The law firm representing Ganieva also represents another accuser Cheri Pierson, who accused Black of raping her at Jeffrey Epstein's mansion in New York. Black denied these claims.

Book publisher
In 2012, Black acquired Phaidon Press, a fine art books publishing house.

Art collection

Two months after the May 2012 anonymous purchase of one of four versions of Edvard Munch's The Scream, The Wall Street Journal reported that Black had been the one who had paid $119.9 million for the pastel, the highest price ever paid for a work of art at auction as of that time. In September 2012, The Museum of Modern Art announced the painting would go on view for a six-month period starting in October.

In June 2013, it was revealed that Leon Black had purchased Head of a Young Apostle, an  work by Raphael for £29 million after a four-party bidding war.

On December 22, 2015, it was reported that Leon Black purchased at auction a complete set of the Daniel Bomberg Babylonian Talmud for $9.3 million. According to a press release from the Sotheby's auction house, the sale is "a new world auction record for any piece of Judaica."

In June 2016, a lawsuit over the Picasso sculpture Bust of a Woman (Marie-Thérèse) between the advisory firm Pelham Europe and art gallery owner Larry Gagosian was settled. Pelham Europe, an agent for a member of Qatar's royal family, and Gagosian, who had resold the bust to Leon Black, both claimed ownership. The case was settled by Maya Widmaier-Picasso, the owner of the sculpture. The settlement included Leon Black getting the sculpture and Widmaier Picasso paying Pelham an undisclosed amount.

See also
History of private equity and venture capital

References

General

Deal Maker's 3-Day Tally: $37 Billion  (New York Times, 2006)
Billionaire Leon Black a tough negiotiator 
Rumor: Leon Black to take Apollo public
Business People; Taking Tyco's View  (New York Times, 2004)

External links
Profile at Forbes.com

1951 births
Living people
20th-century American businesspeople
21st-century American businesspeople
Apollo Global Management people
American billionaires
American chief executives of financial services companies
American financiers
American investment bankers
American money managers
American people of Polish-Jewish descent
Dartmouth College alumni
Drexel Burnham Lambert
Harvard Business School alumni
Jewish American art collectors
Jewish American philanthropists
Private equity and venture capital investors
Jeffrey Epstein